A guitalele (sometimes spelled guitarlele or guilele), also called a ukitar, or kīkū, is a guitar-ukulele hybrid, that is, "a 1/4 size" guitar, a cross between a classical guitar and a tenor or baritone ukulele. The guitalele combines the portability of a ukulele, due to its small size, with the six single strings and resultant chord possibilities of a classical guitar. It may include a built-in microphone that permits playing the guitalele either as an acoustic guitar or connected to an amplifier. The guitalele is variously marketed (and used) as a travel guitar or children's guitar. It is essentially a modern iteration of the Quint guitar.

A guitalele is the size of a ukulele, and is commonly played like a guitar transposed up to “A” (that is, up a 4th, or like a guitar with a capo on the fifth fret). This gives it tuning of ADGCEA, with the top four strings tuned like a low G ukulele.  This is the same as the tuning of the requinto guitar, although the latter are typically larger than a guitalele, and as the most common tuning for the guitarrón mexicano, albeit at a higher octave.

Several guitar and ukulele manufacturers market guitaleles, including Yamaha Corporation's GL-1 Guitalele, Cordoba's Guilele and Mini, Koaloha's D-VI 6-string tenor ukulele, Mele's Guitarlele, Kanilea's GL6 Guitarlele and Islander GL6, Luna's 6-string baritone ukulele, the Yudelele, the Lichty Kīkū, the Kinnard Kīkū, and the Gretsch guitar-ukulele.

Some manufacturers' (e.g., Luna) use of the term "6-string ukulele" (or the like) in describing their six-string, six-course guitaleles can lead to confusion with the common six-string, four-course ukuleles that are typically referred to by the same name. These four-course "6-string ukuleles" are usually strung with a single G string, a closely spaced course of two (often octave-tuned) C strings, a single E string and a closely spaced course of two (often unison-tuned) A strings. This means that chord formation is more akin to a traditional four-string ukulele, while the Guitalele's is more akin to a six-string guitar.

Terminology 
In Latin America, Brazil, Portugal, and Spain, this instrument type is often referred to as a kind of Requinto.
In that sense, the new English portmanteau word Guitalele is a commercial brand used to promote a locally unfamiliar variant of the guitar. Despite the Hawaiian origin of the word Kiku', the term is also a commercial, Anglo-Saxon creation.

Perhaps for these reasons, many sellers avoid naming the instrument altogether, preferring instead to use descriptive terms like '6-string ukulele' or 'Guitar-Ukulele'. In English, the alternative term Ukitar emerged in parallel, but its usage is not widespread among instrument vendors.

References 

Guitars
Ukuleles